Black and White is the third studio album by English new wave band the Stranglers. It was released on 12 May 1978, through record label United Artists in most of the world and A&M in America.

Background
As with the Stranglers' first two albums, Black and White was produced by Martin Rushent. The album sees the Stranglers adopting a more experimental approach to song structures and time signatures (for example, "Curfew" features 7/4 time).

The band recorded a version of "Sweden" sung in Swedish, called "Sverige", and released it in Sweden. The song was partly inspired by Cornwell's PhD placement at Lund University in the mid-1970s. In an anecdote related in the Swedish online magazine Blaskan, it is stated that the song was inspired by a disastrous visit to Sweden during a European tour, when a gig was violently interrupted by a gang of "raggare" (greasers).

The song title "Death and Night and Blood" is taken from a line from Yukio Mishima's novel Confessions of a Mask.

The song "In the Shadows" had previously been released as the B-side to the band's 1977 single "No More Heroes".

Release
Black and White was released on 12 May 1978. The album peaked at No. 2 on the UK Albums Chart, spending eighteen weeks on the chart.

The first 75,000 LPs came with a free white vinyl 7" composed of three tracks: "Walk On By" (a cover of the Burt Bacharach and Hal David song written for and originally recorded by Dionne Warwick), "Mean to Me" and "Tits".

The US version of the album, on the A&M label, was pressed on black and white marbled vinyl, but came without the three-track single.

Singles released from the album were "Nice 'n' Sleazy", b/w "Shut Up", and "Walk On By", b/w "Tank" and "Old Codger". "Old Codger" featured a guest vocal from jazz singer George Melly. An edited version of "Walk On By" with "Tank" was also pressed as a double A-side radio-play single.

Most of these tracks were included in the remastered 2001 CD re-issue of the album.

Critical reception

Reviews of the album were positive. NME called the 'A' side "by far the best work they've ever done", Tim Lott of Record Mirror said the album "belies my expectations of The Stranglers as a spent force" and Melody Maker stated the album, while not as good as their debut, showed that the band could "enlarge their ideas and still come up with good tunes".

Some retrospective critics view Black and White in a lesser light to the band's previous albums. AllMusic called it "arguably the weakest" of the Stranglers' first three albums, "yet it still has some absolutely stunning moments." Trouser Press wrote, "Black and White lacks only good songs. Except for "Nice 'n' Sleazy", most of the tracks are merely inferior rehashes of earlier work, making the LP easily forgettable."

Conversely, David Quantick writing for BBC Music said "The Stranglers turned everything round on their third album", stating that the album was both "essential" and "extraordinary" and "displayed clear influences on the work of Gang of Four and Joy Division.". Record Collector'''s Tim Peacock said Black and White  "served notice that the Stranglers had already outstripped punk", calling it "stark, compelling and every inch as necessary as contemporaneous envelope-pushers including PiL's First Issue and Wire's Chairs Missing."

Track listing

2016 expanded vinyl edition 
Self-released by the Stranglers, Black and White received a deluxe vinyl reissue in 2016, limited to 1000 numbered copies. The original 12-track album is coupled with a bonus 7-track album, which includes various associated tracks from the period and the previously unreleased "Social Secs/Wasting Time".

Side one and two as per original vinyl edition

 "Social Secs", later renamed "Wasting Time", is the original version of "Yellowcake UF6", before it was reversed and the vocals taken out, and becoming the B-side of the "Nuclear Device (The Wizard of Aus)" single in 1979. The original riff also resurfaced on "Do the European" from bassist Jean-Jacques Burnel's solo album Euroman Cometh'', which he was working on at the time.

2018 CD reissue bonus tracks (Parlophone)

Personnel
 The Stranglers

 Hugh Cornwell – guitar, lead and backing vocals (lead vocals on 1-6, 11, 12 and all bonus tracks except "Shut Up" and "Old Codger")
 Jean-Jacques Burnel – bass guitar, lead and backing vocals (lead vocals on 7, 8, 10 and "Shut Up")
 Dave Greenfield – keyboards (Hammond L100 Organ, Hohner Cembalet electric piano, Minimoog synthesizer), lead and backing vocals (lead vocals on 9)
 Jet Black – drums, percussion

 Additional personnel

 Lora Logic – saxophone ("Hey!")
 George Melly – vocals ("Old Codger")
 Lew Lewis – harmonica ("Old Codger")

 Technical

 Martin Rushent – production
 Alan Winstanley – engineering; co-production ("Old Codger")
 Kevin Sparrow – sleeve design
 Ruan O'Lochlainn – cover photography
 The Stranglers – co-production ("Old Codger")
 Andy Pearce – remastering (2016 vinyl reissue)
 Pete Mew – remastering (2018 CD reissue)

References

External links
 

The Stranglers albums
Albums produced by Martin Rushent
1978 albums
United Artists Records albums
A&M Records albums